American Research and Development Corporation (ARDC) was a venture capital and private equity firm founded in 1946 by Georges Doriot,  Ralph Flanders, Merrill Griswold, and Karl Compton.

ARDC is credited with the first major venture capital success story when its 1957 investment of $70,000 in equity ("70% of the company") and approximately $2 million in loans in Digital Equipment Corporation (DEC) became valued at many times the amount invested after the company's success after its initial public offering in 1966.

ARDC continued investing until 1971 with the retirement of Doriot.  In 1972, Doriot merged ARDC with Textron after having invested in over 150 companies.

Legacy
The firm was founded to encourage private sector investments in businesses run by soldiers who were returning from World War II.  ARDC's significance was primarily that it was the first institutional private equity investment firm that accepted money from sources other than wealthy families as had J.H. Whitney & Company and Rockefeller Brothers although it had several investment successes as well.

Former employees of ARDC have gone on to found several prominent venture capital firms including Greylock Partners (founded in 1965 by Charlie Waite and Bill Elfers) and Morgan, Holland Ventures, the predecessor of Flagship Ventures (founded in 1982 by James Morgan).

See also
History of private equity and venture capital
Venture capital
Georges Doriot

References

Companies based in Boston
Financial services companies established in 1946
Venture capital firms of the United States
1946 establishments in Massachusetts
Financial services companies disestablished in 1972
1972 disestablishments in Massachusetts
Venture capital firms